Charles Potter (1634–1663) was an English philosopher. He was the son of Christopher Potter.

Potter was educated at the Queen's College, Oxford. In 1647 he became student of Christ Church, Oxford, and passed M.A. in 1651.

He joined the exiled court of Charles II and converted to Roman Catholicism. At the Restoration he was made user to Queen Henrietta Maria.

Works

References

See also 
 Pythagoras

English philosophers
1663 deaths
1634 births
Place of birth missing